"It's a Shame About Ray" is a song by American alternative rock band the Lemonheads from their album of the same name. Written by frontman Evan Dando and his friend and occasional songwriting partner Tom Morgan, the song was inspired by a headline in an Australian newspaper. The song was released as a single in October 1992, charting in the UK. It has since received positive reception from critics.

Background
"It's a Shame About Ray" was written by Evan Dando with friend Tom Morgan while in Australia. The song title came from when they saw the line, "It's a shame about Ray," in a Sydney newspaper article about a kid called Ray who kept getting kicked out of every school he went to. Dando recalled:

Dando said of the song's ambiguous lyrics, "It's spooky. It's about a disappearing person. It's a very open-ended, grey sort of song. I think it's one of those things, like The Trouble with Harry. Like a mysterious sort of song."

Release
"It's a Shame About Ray" was released on the album of the same name in 1992. The song was released as the debut single from the album, with "Shakey Ground" on the B-side. The single became a minor chart hit, reaching number 31 in the UK and number 68 in Australia. The song also reached number five on the US modern rock charts.

A music video for the song was filmed, featuring Johnny Depp in a starring role. The song has also appeared on the compilation The Best of The Lemonheads: The Atlantic Years.

Reception
"It's a Shame About Ray" has generally seen positive reception from critics. Len Comaratta of Consequence wrote that the song was "among the best releases of the decade (if not beyond)," while Michael Gallucci of Diffuser.fm praised the song as "a ringing '90s power-pop tune laced with Dando's sleepy-stoner delivery and a sprinkling of indie-rock spice." Bill Janovitz of AllMusic described the track as "a wistful, melodic singalong song that has an underlying element of melancholy [that] is delightfully vague in its message" and praised the song's melody and production.

Charts

Release history

References

1992 singles
1992 songs
American power pop songs
The Lemonheads songs